I skuggan av mig själv is the fourth studio album by Swedish-Finnish singer Markoolio, released on 19 November 2003.

Track listing
Radio Markoolio 199.99 MHz - 0:40
Alla borde va' som mig - 3.18
Vilse i skogen (med Håkan Hemlin från Nordman) - 3:31
Riktig artist - 3.17
Aj, aj, aj - 2:51
Radio Markoolio 199.99 MHz - 2.28
Nostalgi - 3:39
Smurfpunk - 2.34
Kramp - 3:27
Radio Markoolio 199.99 MHz - 1:39
Piskad som få - 3:15
Tommy Spandex - 3:10
Rashan II - 4:32
Baka en kaka - feat. kocken Hannu - 3.40
Radio Markoolio 199.99 MHz - 9:24

Charts

Weekly charts

Year-end charts

References

2003 albums
Markoolio albums
Swedish-language albums